Wedding Daze (also known as The Pleasure of Your Company and The Next Girl I See) is a 2006 American romantic comedy film written and directed by Michael Ian Black and starring Jason Biggs and Isla Fisher.

Plot

Against the advice of his best friend Ted, Anderson proposes in a crowded restaurant to his girlfriend Vanessa, while dressed in a cupid costume. The shock of the unexpected proposal leads to her fatal heart attack. 

Utterly devastated and distraught, Anderson quits his job and goes into mourning. A year later, he is still obsessed with his perfect (and deceased) former girlfriend. While Ted and Anderson are having lunch together in a diner, Ted points out he's been in mourning for longer than they were actually together. To help him move on, Ted persuades him to give romance one more try. To placate his friend, Anderson agrees, looks around, and asks attractive waitress Katie to marry him. To both men's utter astonishment, she accepts his proposal.

Katie had had a flashback to the previous evening, when she, her boyfriend William and parents were playing charades. He has her guess 'Will you marry me' and she isn't sure, so she visits her emprisoned dad for advice, which is, listen to your heart. So, when she arrives to work, she tells her friends she's going to accept William. Directly afterwards she walks into the dining area and Anderson proposal happens.

Anderson and Katie go for a walk, warming to each other. She tells him her parents 
had a shotgun wedding in The House of Wedded Bliss in Atlantic City. Before they realise what's happening, Katie proposes to him and he accepts. 

The same day she moves into his apartment, which they call taking things slow. He rigorously cleans his apartment while she rushes to her parents to pack her bags. Feeling guilty, while temporarily and accidentally knocked unconscious by her friend Matador's car, he talks to Vanessa. He promises her to be ever faithful. However when he comes to he goes ahead with plans to meet Katie's parents, and brings Katie to meet his.

At Katie's mom's and stepdad's place, Anderson proves to be terrible at charades. But trying to bond with her dad he goes to see his Jewish toy workshop, while Katie comes face to face with William. He's been there spying, and he desperately wants her back. 

At Anderson's parents', things are also awkward. While his dad takes him for a walk and pep talk, his mother tells Katie she blames Anderson for the death of her would have been daughter-ín-law Vanessa.

Meanwhile, Katie's father Smitty, breaks out of jail to walk her down the aisle. He arrives at his ex-wife (Katie's mother)'s house and through their long lost passion for one another, their love sparks again, much to Stuart's (Lois's current husband) discomfort.

After an argument over Vanessa, who Anderson hadn't told Katie about although he'd had opportunities to do so, their relationship is on the rocks. She comes by the apartment, angrily demanding her things, and they finally declare their mutual affection. 

The couple suddenly run off to Atlantic City, with help from Ted. Anderson, Katie, Ted and the rest of the party drive to Atlantic City in a car from the car dealership where Ted works (under the pretense of test driving the vehicle). Katie's ex-boyfriend, William proceeds to assault Anderson at a rest area outside of Atlantic City on the way. Ted's boss reports the car stolen, and a nervous Ted crashes into a police car, resulting in their arrest.

Meanwhile, Katie's parents know where they're headed and follow, stopping to rob the Tuxedo Depot in preparation for the wedding, and are subsequentially arrested. They all end up in the same police station, and Anderson's parents also turn up after he calls them. Katie's parents trick the two cops on duty so the group is able to escape from the station after taking an officer's gun and locking them in a cell. 

At this point Anderson and Katie reestablish that they want to get married, and for the first time the whole group is in favor. Now in a police van, which the policemen let them use, they drive to Atlantic City and Anderson and Katie finally get married. However, as soon as they step outside they are all arrested. Anderson and Katie spend their honeymoon in jail.

Characters
 Jason Biggs as Anderson
 Isla Fisher as Katie
 Mark Consuelos as Morty
 Michael Weston as Ted
 Ebon Moss-Bachrach as Matador
 Edward Herrmann as Lyle
 Chris Diamantopoulos as William
 Margo Martindale as Betsy
 Joanna Gleason as Lois
 Matt Malloy as Stuart
 Joe Pantoliano as Smitty
 Regan Mizrahi as Diner Boy

Setting
The film is set in Staten Island, New York City. A lot of the scenes are set in the neighborhood of  West New Brighton. The scene outside Gregorio's Florist where Anderson and Katie hug and kiss as well as all the diner scenes are filmed on Forest Avenue, West New Brighton.

Critical reception
According to film review aggregation site Rotten Tomatoes, reviews were generally negative, with 33% positive out of 12 reviews. Brian Orndorf of eFilmCritic.com described it as "a creation of utter inconsequence" and "a chore to sit through".

References

External links
 

2006 direct-to-video films
2006 films
2006 romantic comedy films
American romantic comedy films
2000s English-language films
Films about weddings in the United States
Films directed by Michael Ian Black
Films set in New Jersey
Films set in New York City
Films shot in New York City
Metro-Goldwyn-Mayer direct-to-video films
American black comedy films
2006 directorial debut films
2000s American films